Carex lenticularis is a species of sedge known by the common names lakeshore sedge and goosegrass sedge. It is native to much of northern North America, including most all of Canada and the western United States, where it grows in wet habitats.

Description
This sedge, Carex lenticularis, produces clumps of slender, greenish yellow, angled stems. The inflorescence bears erect spikes with a long bract exceeding the length of the spikes. The fruit is covered in a green, sometimes purple-dotted perigynium beneath a brown or black flower scale.

References

External links
Jepson Manual Treatment - Carex lenticularis
USDA Plants Profile: Carex lenticularis
Carex lenticularis - Photo gallery

lenticularis
Flora of Western Canada
Flora of the Western United States
Flora of the West Coast of the United States
Flora of California
Flora of the Sierra Nevada (United States)
Flora of the Great Lakes region (North America)
Flora of the Northeastern United States
Flora of Eastern Canada
Plants described in 1803
Flora without expected TNC conservation status